Cardston County is a municipal district in southern Alberta, Canada. It is located in Census Division 3 around the Town of Cardston.

The municipal district was established on January 1, 1954, through the amalgamation of the Municipal District of Sugar City No. 5 and part of the Municipal District of Cochrane No. 6. On January 1, 2000, the name was changed from Municipal District of Cardston No. 6 to Cardston County

Geography

Lakes 
Payne Lake

Communities and localities 
The following urban municipalities are surrounded by Cardston County.
Cities
none
Towns
Cardston
Magrath
Villages
Glenwood
Hill Spring
Summer villages
none

The following hamlets are located within Cardston County.
Hamlets
Aetna
Beazer
Carway
Del Bonita
Kimball
Leavitt
Mountain View
Spring Coulee
Welling
Welling Station
Woolford

The following localities are located within Cardston County.
Localities 

Boundary Creek
Bradshaw 
Caldwell
Colles
Glenwoodville
Hacke
Hartleyville
Jefferson

Owendale
Parkbend
Raley
Rush Lake
Taylorville
Twin River
Whiskey Gap

Other places
Woolford Flat

Demographics 

In the 2016 Census of Population conducted by Statistics Canada, Cardston County had a population of 4,481 living in 1,043 of its 1,260 total private dwellings, a  change from its 2011 population of 4,167.

See also 
List of communities in Alberta
List of municipal districts in Alberta

References

External links 

 
Municipal districts in Alberta